Olivia Croucher Buckingham (born 1983) is a Hong Kong-born British socialite, magazine editor, and former photographer. She is a contributing editor to Hong Kong Tatler and Thailand Tatler.

Biography 
Buckingham was born in Hong Kong in 1990. Her family has been in Hong Kong for four generations. Her maternal great-grandfather was the philanthropist and businessman Noel Croucher.

She boarded at Heathfield School, Ascot and studied photography at the London School of Fine Arts.

Career 
Buckingham worked as a portrait and landscape photographer, with her first exhibit shown at China Tang in London. She later began working for a public relations firm but left the public relations job to become a fashion stylist. Buckingham is a contributing editor to Hong Kong Tatler and Thailand Tatler. In 2019 she partnered with Lady Emily Compton to release a jewellery collection called RockChic. She also partnered with Lady Emily to launch Emily & Olivia, a styling service.

References 

Living people
1990 births
British jewellery designers
English women photographers
English magazine editors
English socialites
Fashion stylists
Hong Kong people of English descent
Hong Kong socialites
Hong Kong women writers
People educated at Heathfield School, Ascot
Women magazine editors
Women jewellers